Jeffrey F. L. Partridge is an American writer and essayist, winner of the 2007 American Book Award for Beyond Literary Chinatown.

Works
 "Aiiieeeee! and the Asian American Literary Movement: A Conversation with Shawn Wong.", MELUS, Vol. 29, 2004

Anthologies

References

Year of birth missing (living people)
Living people
American essayists
American Book Award winners